State Treasurer of Mississippi is a post created in 1817 when the state was admitted to the Union.  Before the state was formed by splitting the Alabama Territory from the Mississippi Territory, an equivalent post was the Territorial Treasurer General, established in 1802.

History 
The position of state treasurer was enumerated as part of the executive branch in Mississippi's first constitution in 1817. The office was filled by the choice of the Mississippi Legislature. The first treasurer, Samuel Brooks, was elected on December 19, 1817. The 1832 constitution stipulated that the treasurer was to be popularly elected to serve a two-year term. The 1869 constitution expanded the officer's term to four years.

Powers, responsibilities, and structure 
Under Article 5, Section 134, of the Mississippi Constitution, the state treasurer is elected every four years. Candidates for the office must meet the same constitutional qualifications as candidates for the position of secretary of state; they must be at least 25 years old and have lived in the state for at least five years. The office holder is not subject to term limits.
Most of the treasurer's duties are determined by state statute.

The treasurer is responsible for keeping certain financial records for the state, including receipts, deposits, and disbursement of money from the state treasury. The constitution requires the treasurer to review and approve all contracts for the provision of "stationary, printing, paper, and fuel" for state agencies and the legislature. They also oversee public bond issues. The treasurer is ex officio the treasurer of the Mississippi Employment Security Commission and chair of the College Savings Plan of Mississippi Board. They are also ex officio a member of several other state boards, including the State Bond Commission, Public Employees Retirement Board, Mississippi Business Finance Corporation, Mississippi Development Bank, License Tag Commission, Tort Claims Board, Mississippi Windstorm Underwriting Association Board, Mississippi Guaranty Pool Board, Economic Development Strategic Planning Task Force, State Prison Emergency and Management Board, and the Historic Properties Trust Fund Advisory Committee.

The treasurer's salary is $90,000 per year, but is set to increase to $120,000 annually in 2024.

List of treasurers general

Territorial Treasurers General

State Treasurers

References

Works cited 
 
History, Mississippi Dept of Archives and (1924). The Official and Statistical Register of the State of Mississippi. Department of Archives and History.
 
 
 

Treasurers